Pope Lucius II (1144–1145) created eleven cardinals in two consistories.

Consistories

19 May 1144 
 Ubaldo Caccianemici, Can.Reg. — cardinal-priest of S. Croce in Gerusalemme, † 1170
 Giulio — cardinal-priest of S. Marcello, then (19 December 1158) cardinal-bishop of Palestrina, † October 1164
 Berardo — cardinal-deacon of the Holy Roman Church, † after 1146

22 December 1144 
 Guarino, Can.Reg. — cardinal-bishop of Palestrina, † 6 February 1158
 Robert Pullen — cardinal-priest of SS. Martino e Silvestro, † September 1146
 Guido Puella, Can.Reg. — cardinal-priest of S. Pudenziana, † 1157
 Villano Gaetani — cardinal-priest of S. Stefano in Monte Celio; later (Mai 1146) archbishop of Pisa, † 1175
 Giacinto Bobone — cardinal-deacon of S. Maria in Cosmedin, later (21 March 1191) Pope Celestine III, † 8 January 1198
 Jordan, O.Carth. — cardinal-deacon of the Holy Roman Church, then (21 December 1145) cardinal-priest of S. Susanna, † 1154
 Cenzio — cardinal-deacon of the Holy Roman Church, then (1145) cardinal-deacon of SS. Sergio e Bacco † after 1146
 Bernardo, Can.Reg. — cardinal-deacon of the Holy Roman Church, then cardinal-priest of S. Clemente (21 December 1145) and cardinal-bishop of Porto e S. Rufina (19 December 1158), † 18 August 1176

Additional notes

According to Lorenzo Cardella Lucius II promoted also Nikolaus of Germany to the rank of cardinal-deacon or cardinal-priest of S. Lorenzo in Damaso, but no such cardinal appears among signatories of the papal bulls. Cardella mentions also cardinal-deacon Guy of S. Maria in Portico but he was created only by Eugene III and is identical with future Antipope Paschalis III. Besides, it is possible that Lucius II promoted also cardinal-deacon Pietro of S. Maria in Via Lata, but most probably he was created by Eugene III in March 1145.

References

Sources

 Barbara Zenker: Die Mitglieder des Kardinalkollegiums von 1130 bis 1159. Würzburg 1964, pp. 224–225
 Johannes M. Brixius: Die Mitglieder des Kardinalkollegiums von 1130-1181. Berlin 1912, pp. 51–53
Michael Horn: Studien zur Geschichte Papst Eugens III.(1145-1153), Peter Lang Verlag 1992
Philipp Jaffé, Regesta pontificum Romanorum ab condita Ecclesia ad annum post Christum natum MCXCVIII, vol. II, Berlin 1888
Lorenzo Cardella: Memorie storiche de' cardinali della Santa Romana Chiesa, Rome 1792, vol. I, pt. 2

Lucius II
College of Cardinals
12th-century Catholicism